Actin-like protein 7A is a protein that in humans is encoded by the ACTL7A gene.

The protein encoded by this gene is a member of a family of actin-related proteins (ARPs) which share significant amino acid sequence identity to conventional actins. Both actins and ARPs have an actin fold, which is an ATP-binding cleft, as a common feature. The ARPs are involved in diverse cellular processes, including vesicular transport, spindle orientation, nuclear migration and chromatin remodeling. This gene (ACTL7A), and related gene, ACTL7B, are intronless, and are located approximately 4 kb apart in a head-to-head orientation within the familial dysautonomia candidate region on 9q31. Based on mutational analysis of the ACTL7A gene in patients with this disorder, it was concluded that it is unlikely to be involved in the pathogenesis of dysautonomia. The ACTL7A gene is expressed in a wide variety of adult tissues, however, its exact function is not known.

References

External links

Further reading

Human proteins